Perry Township is one of the nine townships of Montgomery County, Ohio, United States. As of the 2010 census the population was 5,999.

Geography
Located in the western part of the county, it borders the following townships:
Clay Township - north
Jefferson Township - southeast corner
Jackson Township - south
Lanier Township, Preble County - southwest corner
Twin Township, Preble County - west
Harrison Township, Preble County - northwest corner

Several populated places are located in Perry Township:
Part of the city of Brookville, in the north
Part of the village of New Lebanon, in the south
The unincorporated community of Pyrmont, in the northwest

Name and history
It is one of twenty-six Perry Townships statewide.

Government
The township is governed by a three-member board of trustees, who are elected in November of odd-numbered years to a four-year term beginning on the following January 1. Two are elected in the year after the presidential election and one is elected in the year before it. There is also an elected township fiscal officer, who serves a four-year term beginning on April 1 of the year after the election, which is held in November of the year before the presidential election. Vacancies in the fiscal officership or on the board of trustees are filled by the remaining trustees.

References

External links
County website

Townships in Montgomery County, Ohio
Townships in Ohio